Kyainseikgyi Township is a township of Kawkareik District in the Kayin State of Myanmar. It is the fourth-biggest township in Kayin State. The two main sub-towns are Kyeikdon and Payathonsu. It is drained by the Zami, Winyaw and the Haungtharaw rivers.

The basic education high schools located within Kyain Seikgyi Township are BEHS Kyainnseikyi, B.E.H.S-Tagondaing, BEHS Kale, BEHS Hparpya, BEHS Anankwin, BEHS Kyaikdon, BEHS Azin, BEHS Kyakhatchaung, BEHS Thanpayar, BEHS Taungpauk and BEHS Payathonzu. The main hospitals are Kya Inn Seikyi township public hospital, Kale-Tagundaing Station Hospital, Kyaikdon Station hospital, Payathonzu Station Hospital.

Subtownships
The township contains the following subtownships:
Hpayarthonesu Sub-township
Kyaik done Sub-township

Notes

External links
 "Kyainseikgyi Township - Kayin State" map ID: MIMU154v01, creation date: 4 August 2010, Myanmar Information Management Unit (MIMU)
 "Kya-In Seikkyi Google Satellite Map" Maplandia World Gazetteer

 
Townships of Kayin State